Fiordimonte is a frazione of the comune of Valfornace in the Province of Macerata in the Italian region Marche, located about  southwest of Ancona and about  southwest of Macerata. It was a separate comune until January 1, 2017, when it was merged with Pievebovigliana, which created the Valfornace comune.

Former municipalities of the Marche